The Notion Club Papers is an abandoned novel by J. R. R. Tolkien, written during 1945 and published posthumously in Sauron Defeated, the 9th volume of The History of Middle-earth. It is a time travel story, written while The Lord of the Rings was being developed. The Notion Club is a fictionalization of (and a play on words on the name of) Tolkien's own such club, the Inklings.

Although unfinished, the text of The Notion Club Papers runs for some 120 pages in Sauron Defeated. Embedded within the story are Tolkien's versions of European legends: King Sheave, and The Death of St. Brendan, a three-page poem also titled 'Imram'. Sauron Defeated includes some further 40 pages of Christopher Tolkien's commentary and notes on The Notion Club Papers, and reproduces examples of the pages hand-written by his father.

Plot

The story revolves around the meetings of an Oxford arts discussion group, the Notion Club. During these meetings, Alwin Arundel Lowdham discusses his lucid dreams about Númenor, a lost civilisation connected with Atlantis and with Tolkien's Middle-earth. Through these dreams, he "discovers" much about the Númenor story and the languages of Middle-earth (notably Quenya, Sindarin, and Adûnaic). While not finished, at the end of the given story it becomes clear Lowdham himself is a reincarnation of sorts of Elendil.  Other members of the Club mention their vivid dreams of other times and places.

The Notion Club Papers is elaborately constructed. The main story (the Notion Club, itself the frame of the Númenor story) is set within a frame story. Both are set in the future; Tolkien created the work in 1945.

In the frame story, a Mr. Green finds documents in sacks of waste paper at Oxford in 2012. These documents, the Notion Club Papers of the title, are the incomplete notes of meetings of the Notion Club; these meetings are said to have occurred in the 1980s. The notes, written by one of the participants, include references to events that 'occurred' in the 1970s and 1980s. Green publishes a first edition containing excerpts from the documents. Two scholars read the first edition, ask to examine the documents, and then submit a full report. The "Notes to the Second Edition" mentions the contradictory evidence in dating the documents, and an alternative date is presented: they may have been written in the 1940s (which was of course when Tolkien actually created the matter).

Analysis

Literary group

The text comments on C. S. Lewis's Space Trilogy. Lewis and Tolkien were close friends and members of the Inklings literary club. The two men had agreed to write space travel (Lewis) and time travel (Tolkien) novels, since they agreed there were too few stories in existence that they really liked. Tolkien's remarks on the trilogy are similar in style to Lewis's commentary on Tolkien's poem The Lay of Leithian, in which he created a fictional history of scholarship of the poem and even referred to other manuscript traditions to recommend changes to the poem. 
Tolkien's biographer, Humphrey Carpenter, describes The Notion Club as a "thinly disguised" Inklings, noting that the time travellers are two Oxford dons who are members of the club.

Jane Stanford links The Notion Club Papers to John O'Connor Power's 1899 The Johnson Club Papers; the two books have a similar title page. The Johnson Club was a "Public House School" and met in taverns as the Inklings did. The purpose was "Fellowship and free Exchange of Mind". Both clubs presented papers "which were read before the members and discussed". The Johnson Club was named for Samuel Johnson, who like Tolkien, had a strong connection to Pembroke College, Oxford. Stanley Unwin, Tolkien's publisher, was a nephew of Fisher Unwin, the founding member of The Johnson Club.

Time travel

The Notion Club Papers may be seen as an attempt to re-write the incomplete The Lost Road (written around 1936-1937), being another attempt to tie the Númenórean legend in with a more modern tale through time travel, following the then-popular theory of J. W. Dunne. Both stories however break off before much time-travelling takes place. Tolkien finally managed to incorporate time travel in The Lord of the Rings, in the form of a visit to the Elvish land of Lothlorien, following a tradition that in Elfland, time is different. According to Christopher Tolkien, had his father continued The Notion Club Papers, he would have linked the real world of Alwin Lowdham with his eponymous ancestor Ælfwine of England, the fictional compiler of The Book of Lost Tales, and with Atlantis. One of the members of the Notion Club, Michael George Ramer, combines lucid dreams with time-travel and experiences the tsunami that sank Númenor. He cannot tell if it is history, or fantasy, or something in between. Verlyn Flieger writes that the journeying about of the protagonist recalls the Celtic Imram voyages, noting that Tolkien wrote a poem named "Imram" at the same time, and it was the only element published in his lifetime.

The modern name "Alwin", the Old English name "Ælfwine", and the Quenya name "Elendil" all mean "Elf-friend"; in The Lost Road, the story involves father-son characters named Edwin/Elwin, Eadwine/Aelfwine, Audoin/Alboin, Amandil/Elendil, all meaning "Bliss-friend/Elf-friend", as the pair travel successively further back in time all the way through history to Númenor. This situates Númenor, whose downfall is described in The Silmarillion, as part of an invented mythology for England.

Flieger comments that had either The Lost Road or The Notion Club Papers been finished,

Prophecy

The Notion Club Papers mentions a great storm in England, on 12 June 1987. The actual Great Storm of 1987 occurred in October of that year.  Christopher Tolkien drew attention to this, saying "my father's 'prevision' was only out by four months".

References

Sources

 
 
 
  

The History of Middle-earth
Unfinished novels
Novels about time travel